Joseph DeWitt Hollingsworth (June 20, 1925 – August 18, 1975) was an American football fullback who played for three seasons for the Pittsburgh Pirates of the NFL. He played college football at the University of Georgia for the Georgia Bulldogs football and Eastern Kentucky University for the Eastern Kentucky Colonels football team.

References

1925 births
1975 deaths
Pittsburgh Steelers players
American football fullbacks
Players of American football from Georgia (U.S. state)
Georgia Bulldogs football players
Eastern Kentucky Colonels football players
People from Walker County, Georgia